King Edward Medical University (KEMU) is a public  medical university located in Lahore, Punjab, Pakistan. Founded in 1860, the university is named after King Edward VII.

Established by the British Raj, named as Lahore Medical School. In 1868, the University of Dublin granted students of the Lahore Medical School ”privilege similar to the granted to students from English schools”. In 1871, the university added Mayo Hospital as an affiliated hospital, replacing the existing Anarkali Dispensary. The same year the college became an affiliate of University of the Punjab, while in 1887, the university added Lady Aitchison Hospital as a second teaching hospital.

After Pakistan's independence, the university became the only medical college in the province and in 2005 became a charter to award degrees in its own right. It has since gone through expansion, and oversees seven tertiary referral hospitals including the Lady Willingdon Hospital.

In 2015, HEC published the 5th ranking of Pakistani Higher Education Institutions. KEMU is ranked 6th amongst the medical universities of Pakistan by the Higher Education Commission of Pakistan.

History
King Edward Medical College was established in 1860 as the Lahore Medical College. It is the fifth oldest medical school in South Asia, after Medical College Kolkata (January 28, 1835), Madras Medical College, Chennai (February 2, 1835)  Grant Medical College, Bombay (1845) and Sarojini Naidu Medical College Agra (1854).

The first academic building was completed in 1883. On 21 December 1911, Lahore Medical College was renamed King Edward Medical College in honour of the late King and Emperor and was elevated to the status of an independent, degree-granting university on 12 May 2005, when it became King Edward Medical University.

Campus and departments

The university has the following departments:

Basic science departments
 Anatomy
 Biochemistry
 Community Medicine
 Forensic Medicine
 Pathology
 Pharmacology
 Physiology
 Histology

Medicine and allied departments
 Cardiology
 Tuberculosis and Chest Medicine (Pulmonology)
 Clinical Oncology (Radiotherapy)
 Child Psychiatry
 Dermatology Unit I and II
 Neurology
 Pediatrics
 General Medicine Unit I, II, III and IV
 Physical Medicine and Rehabilitation
 Psychiatry and Behavioural Sciences
The psychiatry department of KEMU has been designated status of Psychotrauma Centre for the province of Punjab by Prime Ministers National Advisory Council in the aftermath of killings at Army Public School, Peshawar killings in 2014. This centre is created to conduct workshops on trauma, identify and train teams of mental health professionals and develop modules for training. 

The department is being headed by Prof. Aftab Asif. The chief coordinator is Dr Ali Madeeh Hashmi. A technical expert committee has been made with prominent psychiatrists and psychologists from Punjab. The centre held its first workshop for the first responders' team and trained professionals from 1122 rescue service, traffic police, and Punjab police officers in 'Psychological First Aid' on Jan 17, 2015. 
The next workshop was carried out on Feb 07, 2015. Media professionals from the different genres were included and topics such as responsible reporting of terrorist activities, mental health problems faced by media personnel and the dynamics between government, media and terrorism highlighted the programme.
 Radiotherapy
 Social and Preventive Medicine
 Preventive Pediatrics

Surgery and allied departments
 Anesthesiology unit I and II
 Cardiac Surgery
 Neurosurgery

Neurosurgery Department pioneers spinal cord stimulation in Pakistan. Pakistan's first Spinal Cord Stimulation surgery was done by Neurosurgery Department of King Edward Medical University / Mayo Hospital Lahore in August 2018. Medtronic Spinal Cord Stimulation (SCS) system was purchased via tender. The team included Professor Shahzad Shams (Chairman Neurosurgery King Edward Medical University / Mayo Hospital Lahore), Dr Muhammad Tariq (Asst Prof Neurosurgery King Edward Medical University, Lahore), Dr Ammar Anwer (Research Fellow ANFN-DBS Pakistan) and Dr Rupesh Jung Raut (R 3, Neurosurgery Department King Edward Medical University / Mayo Hospital Lahore). The patient was suffering from phantom limb syndrome and Medtronic Prime Advance™ SCS system was implanted bilaterally in cervical spine.

 Obstetrics and Gynaecology Unit I, II, III and IV
 Ophthalmology unit I, II and III
 Oral and Maxillofacial Surgery
 Orthopedics Unit I and II
 Otorhinolaryngology Unit I and II
 Pediatric Surgery
 Plastic Surgery
 Radiology
 General Surgery Unit I, II, III and IV
 Thoracic Surgery
 Urology

Attached hospitals
 Mayo Hospital Lahore
 Lady Willingdon Hospital
 Lady Aitchison Hospital
 Nawaz Sharif Hospital, Yakki Gate, Lahore
 Nawaz Sharif Hospital, Kot Khawaja Saeed, Lahore
 Shahdra Hospital
Govt. Said Mitha Teaching Hospital Lahore
 Mian Munshi Hospital Lahore

Institutes, schools and centres
 Centre For Nuclear Medicine (CENUM)
 Convalescent Centre
 College of Ophthalmology and Allied Vision Sciences(COAVS)
 School of Nursing
 School of Orthopaedic Technology
 School of Paramedical
 School of Physiotherapy

Auxiliary services

Library
 Computer labs
 Wi-Fi

Attached hostel facilities
 Boys Hostel
 Girls Hostel

New buildings and campuses 
After getting status of university in 2005, A new campus building was designed. The new building was completed in 2019. Another building is under construction with the help of alumni of the university which donated 9 million dollars for the new structure. The university has also acquired new land outside Lahore to build a sub-campus.

Academic degrees offered

Undergraduate
 Bachelor of Medicine and Bachelor of Surgery (MBBS)
 Bachelor of Science (B.S.(Hons)) in Allied Health Sciences
 Doctor of physical therapy  (DPT)

Postgraduate
 Doctor of Philosophy (Ph.D)
 Master in Community Eye Health (MCEH)
 Doctor of Medicine (MD)
 Master of Surgery (MS)
 Fellow of College of Physicians and Surgeons Pakistan (FCPS)
 Membership of the Royal College of Physicians (MRCP(UK))
 Master of Philosophy (M.Phil.)
 Diploma

Organization
King Edward Medical University is headed by the Vice Chancellor, Prof. Ijaz Hussain. At any time of year the university has over 1300 undergraduate and over 800 postgraduate students. Among the postgraduate doctors, 500 are doing residencies under the College of Physicians & Surgeons Pakistan.

Admission to King Edward Medical University is awarded to the students who have the highest merit in the province of Punjab and after primary selection, the list of selected candidates is sent to Dr Muhammad Awais (Chairman Pakistan Medical Board) for approval. The merit for admission is calculated from marks obtained in Higher Secondary School Certificate (HSSC) exam plus the marks obtained in the entry test plus marks obtained in Secondary School Certificate  (SSC). The percentage of each of these exams contributing to the final merit is different each year. The entry test takes place in September. Criteria for selection, for undergraduate seats, of foreign students and students with foreign examination is based on equivalents tables present for foreign examinations to that of local HSSC examination.

The graduation time period is five years. After graduation, a one-year internship (house job) is done in Mayo Hospital or any Government Hospital. The interns are given rotations in departments based on merit. This merit is made from marks obtained in a final professional examination and all the other professional examinations, with deductions for any failures in the exams. Of all the specialities on offer, the Medicine and Surgery ones are the most competitive and allow only the best of each graduating class. After completion of the internship the full registration status to a Doctor is awarded by Pakistan Medical and Dental Council (PMDC).

Student societies

The student societies of King Edward Medical University include: 

King Edward Literary Society URDU" KELS URDU (the oldest society of KEMU, started in 1882 as "Bazm e Adab")
King Edward Debating Society (Since 1887)  (KEDS)
King Edward Literary Society English "KELS ENGLISH" 
Kemcolians' Arts & Photography Society (KAPS)
International Federation of Medical Students' Associations - Pakistan KEMU LC (IFMSA-Pakistan KEMU LC)
Students' Patients Welfare Society. (SPWS)
Kemcolians' Sports Club
Kemcolians' Dramatic Society  (KDS)
Kemcolians' Akhuwat Club (A society for social welfare among students and patients)
Kemcolians United - KemUnited - The King Edward Medical University Blog 
Humans of KEMU is a Facebook page dedicated to the stories of the students, alumni and teaching staff: www.facebook.com/HumansOfKEMU
The members of these societies compete at the national and international level and have won numerous competitions. 
King Edward Medical University Magazine, KEMCOL, is maintained by the students. 
The previous and current students of KEMU are referred to as "Kemcolians".

Notable alumni
 Israr Ahmed - renowned Islamic scholar
 Riaz Haider MD -  American cardiologist, academic and past president, American Heart Association
 Ayub Ommaya MD, ScD (h.c.), FRCS, FACS - neurosurgeon and the inventor of the Ommaya reservoir.
 Prem Chandra Dhanda - physician and a medical academic
 Amjad Saqib - social entrepreneur, development practitioner, former civil servant and author
 Faisal Sultan - infectious diseases physician who has served as the Chief Executive Officer of the Shaukat Khanum Memorial Cancer Hospital and Research Centre
 Riaz Haider - American physician, cardiologist, author, and medical educator.
Dr Umar Sadat - Hunterian Professor (2019) – Royal College of Surgeons of England.
Farid Ahmad Khan - Pakistani plastic surgeon. Former Chairman and Dean at Shaikh Sayed Medical Complex, and former Registrar at KEMU from 2011 to 2015.

Alumni associations

 The King Edward Medical College Alumni Association of North America
 The King Edward Medical College Alumni Association of the United Kingdom
 The King Edward Medical College/University Alumni for all Kemcolians

See also
 Education in Pakistan

References

External links

 King Edward Medical University - Official website of King Edward Medical University.
 King Edward Medical University Blog Kemcolians United - Official blog of King Edward Medical University.
King Edward Medical University Neurosurgery Official Facebook Page.

 
Medical universities in Punjab, Pakistan
Medical research institutes in Pakistan
Medical colleges in Punjab, Pakistan
Public universities and colleges in Pakistan
1860 establishments in India
Educational institutions established in 1860
Lahore
Lahore District
Public medical universities